Cliff is a census-designated place in Grant County, New Mexico, United States. Its population was 293 as of the 2010 census.

Demographics

History
Cliff and the nearby town of Gila were settled in 1884, in the Gila River Valley.  The area was and is primarily a ranching and farming community.  The local Cliff Post Office was established on August 4, 1894.

Stolen de Kooning painting
In 2017, Woman-Ochre, a 1955 painting by Willem de Kooning, which was stolen from the University Of Arizona Museum Of Art in 1985, was found in the home of a recently deceased couple in Cliff.

Culture
The annual Grant County Fair is held annually at the adjoining fairgrounds next to Cliff High School.

Education
Cliff schools are part of the Silver Consolidated School District.  The District's main office is located in Silver City.

Cliff Elementary School (K-6)
Students: 124
Teachers:  7.7
Cliff High School (7-12)
Students 155
Teachers 12.1

Transportation
U.S. Route 180 connects Cliff to Silver City, and NM 211 connects Cliff to Gila.

Points of interest
Bill Evan's Lake
Gila Riparian Preserve

References

Census-designated places in Grant County, New Mexico
Census-designated places in New Mexico